West Sussex County Council (WSCC) is the authority that governs the non-metropolitan county of West Sussex. The county also contains seven district and borough councils, and 158 town, parish and neighbourhood councils. The county council has 70 elected councillors. The Chief Executive and their team of Directors are responsible for the day-to-day running of the council.

The county elects eight members of parliament (MPs) to the House of Commons of the Parliament of the United Kingdom.

Since 1997, West Sussex County Council has been controlled by the Conservative Party. In 2019, the council's Children Services department was described in a Children's Commissioner's report as "clearly failing across all domains in the strongest terms" leading to the resignation of then council leader Louise Goldsmith.

History 

The Local Government Act 1888 created the administrative county of West Sussex, with its own county council, from the three western rapes of the ancient county of Sussex, that is the rapes of Chichester, Arundel and Bramber. Except for the three county boroughs of Brighton, Hastings and Eastbourne, the three eastern rapes of Lewes, Pevensey and Hastings came under the control of East Sussex County Council. Until 1898 it existed alongside the Urban and Rural Sanitary Districts when these were abolished in favour of a new network of urban and rural districts.

The Local Government Act 1972 abolished the previous structure of local government in England and Wales. At this time West Sussex became a non-metropolitan county, divided into districts. This act created the two-tier system of government that exists in West Sussex to this day.

Chairmen and chairwomen of West Sussex County Council
Since 2011 most chairs of the council serve a two-year term, previously the term was more usually four years though before 1962 the position could essentially last almost a lifetime. Peter Mursell was the only individual to serve two non-consecutive terms, the second being after his 1969 knighthood. Cliff Robinson (died 2009) was the only chairman elected as a Liberal.

Political control
Paul Marshall (Conservative) has been leader of West Sussex County Council since 2019. He replaced Louise Goldsmith who had been leader since May 2010.

Responsibilities 
The council is responsible for public services such as education, transport, strategic planning, emergency services, social services, public safety, the fire service and waste disposal.

District councils 
Adur District Council
Arun District Council
Chichester District Council
Crawley Borough Council
Horsham District Council
Mid Sussex District Council
Worthing Borough Council

Parish councils 
See List of civil parishes in West Sussex

The Council 

The whole County Council is the ultimate decision-making body and the principal forum for major political debate. Its 70 members meet six times a year. The County Council reserves to itself decisions on key policy plans, questions members of the Cabinet, debates major pieces of work by Select Committees and notices of motion.

It appoints the Leader who decides the composition and areas of competence of the Cabinet, to which responsibility is delegated for carrying out many of the County Council's existing policies. It also appoints the Scrutiny Committees which examine and review decisions and actions of the Cabinet and Cabinet Members, as well as some non-Executive committees and a Standards Committee. The current leader is Paul Marshall.

Cabinet 
The West Sussex Cabinet has ten members selected from the Conservative majority. The Cabinet proposes the key policy decisions of the Council, which are subject to agreement by the full County Council of 70 members. Each member has a portfolio of work for which they take personal responsibility.

Elections 

County council elections took place on 6 May 2021. For detailed results for each electoral division see 2021 West Sussex County Council election

|}

Elections took place on 4 May 2017. Results are below.

|}
Since the divisions had been slightly reorganised and there was one less division than previously the gains and losses are not strictly meaningful.

County council elections took place on 2 May 2013. For detailed results for each electoral division see 2013 West Sussex County Council election.

|}

References

External links 
 West Sussex County Council – Official website

 
Local government in West Sussex
County councils of England
1889 establishments in England
Local education authorities in England
Local authorities in West Sussex
Major precepting authorities in England
Leader and cabinet executives